Aphelodoris varia is a species of sea slug, a dorid nudibranch, a shell-less marine gastropod mollusk in the family Dorididae.

Taxonomic history

This species was described by Abraham in 1864 as Doris variabilis but this name is preoccupied by Doris variabilis Kelaart, 1858.

Distribution
This species is recorded from New South Wales, Australia.

References

Dorididae
Gastropods described in 1877